Templemichael  is a civil parish in County Cork, Ireland.

References

Civil parishes of County Cork